Indovina chi viene a Natale? ( Guess who's coming for Christmas?) is a 2013 Italian comedy film produced, co-written and directed by  Fausto Brizzi.

Plot 
The Sereni family meets in the grandparents' house for Christmas holidays: Chiara is divorced, with two children to be kept, and falls in love with the careless Domenico. The children create so much trouble, so that the mother and Domenico will separate; Dad Giulio is terrified because his daughter Valentina is engaged to Francesco, a handsome boy who does not have arms because of an accident. In addition to this, he has to put up with his brother Antonio, who wants to offer a fictions on TV about the figure of his father, who died a few months ago. The family atmosphere is not the best, but at New Year's tensions are resolved into a nice champagne toast.

Cast  
  
 Claudio Bisio as  Domenico
 Cristiana Capotondi as  Valentina Sereni
 Claudia Gerini as  Chiara Sereni
 Carlo Buccirosso as Antonio Sereni
 Raoul Bova as Francesco
 Angela Finocchiaro as  Marina
 Diego Abatantuono as  Giulio Sereni
 Gigi Proietti as  Leonardo Sereni
 Rosalia Porcaro as  Elisa
 Isa Barzizza as Grandma Emma
 Massimo Ghini as Policeman
 Fausto Brizzi as Policeman

See also
 List of Christmas films

References

External links

2010s Christmas comedy films
Italian Christmas comedy films
Films directed by Fausto Brizzi
2013 comedy films
2013 films
2010s Italian films
2010s Italian-language films